Yuliya Volkova is a paralympic swimmer from Ukraine competing mainly in category S12 events.

Yuliya competed as part of the Ukrainian paralympic swimming team at both the 2004 and 2008 Summer Paralympics. In the 2008 games she won a solitary bronze in the 100m butterfly and also finished sixth in the 50m and 100m freestyle, fifth in the 200m individual medley and fourth in the 100m breaststroke.

References

External links
 

Year of birth missing (living people)
Living people
Ukrainian female breaststroke swimmers
Ukrainian female butterfly swimmers
Ukrainian female freestyle swimmers
Ukrainian female medley swimmers
Paralympic swimmers of Ukraine
Paralympic bronze medalists for Ukraine
Paralympic medalists in swimming
Swimmers at the 2004 Summer Paralympics
Swimmers at the 2008 Summer Paralympics
Medalists at the 2004 Summer Paralympics
Medalists at the 2008 Summer Paralympics
S12-classified Paralympic swimmers
Medalists at the World Para Swimming Championships
Medalists at the World Para Swimming European Championships
21st-century Ukrainian women